The nighthawk is a nocturnal bird of the subfamily  Chordeilinae, within the nightjar family, Caprimulgidae, native to the western hemisphere. The term "nighthawk", first recorded in the King James Bible of 1611, was originally a local name in England for  the European nightjar. Its use in the Americas refers to members of the genus Chordeiles and related genera was first recorded in 1778.

Nighthawks are medium-sized birds with long wings, short legs, and very short bills. They usually nest on the ground. They feed on flying insects.

Nightjars are sometimes referred to as goatsuckers from the mistaken belief that they suck milk from goats (the Latin for goatsucker is Caprimulgus).

In October 2018, the University of Alberta published research on the common nighthawk revealing that it travels 20,000 kilometres every year during migration between the rainforests and savannas of Brazil and its breeding grounds in northern Alberta. 

Nighthawks have small feet, of little use for walking, and long pointed wings. Their soft plumage is cryptically coloured to resemble bark or leaves. Some species perch facing along a branch, rather than across it as birds usually do. This helps to conceal them during the day. The female lays two patterned eggs directly onto bare ground.

They are mostly active in the late evening and early morning or at night and feed on moths and other large flying insects. The bill opens very wide and has a slightly hooked upper tip.

Nighthawks are similar in most respects to the nightjars, but have shorter bills and plumage that is less soft. Nighthawks are less strictly nocturnal than many nightjars and may be seen hunting when there is still light in the sky.
On March 1st, 2022 The Holland, PA 11U Travel baseball team (81 wins 21 losses since 2020) adopted the Nighthawk as their official team.

Taxonomy and systematics

References